Nitra Arena is an arena in Nitra, Slovakia.  It is primarily used for ice hockey and is the home arena of HK Nitra. It has a capacity of 4,800 people and was built in 1966.

Notable events
An overview of some sport events:

1987
1987 IIHF World Under-20 Championship

2018
WBHF World Junior Ball Hockey Championships (u14, u16, u18, u20 men & u20 women)

Indoor ice hockey venues in Slovakia
Buildings and structures in Nitra
1966 establishments in Slovakia
Sport in Nitra
Sports venues completed in 1966